Hennadiy Volodymyrovych Zhylkin (born 3 August 1969) is a Ukrainian football coach and a former player.

References

External links
 

1969 births
Footballers from Dnipro
Living people
Soviet footballers
Ukrainian footballers
Association football goalkeepers
Ukrainian expatriate footballers
Ukrainian expatriate sportspeople in Kazakhstan
Ukrainian expatriate sportspeople in Latvia
Ukrainian expatriate sportspeople in Israel
Ukrainian expatriate sportspeople in Russia
Ukrainian expatriate sportspeople in Belarus
Expatriate footballers in Israel
Expatriate footballers in Russia
Expatriate footballers in Kazakhstan
Expatriate footballers in Latvia
Expatriate footballers in Belarus
Ukrainian Premier League players
Russian Premier League players
SC Odesa players
FC Dnipro players
FC Krystal Kherson players
FC Torpedo Zaporizhzhia players
FC Karpaty Lviv players
Maccabi Petah Tikva F.C. players
SC Tavriya Simferopol players
FC Nyva Vinnytsia players
FC Chernomorets Novorossiysk players
FC Hirnyk Rovenky players
FC Arsenal Tula players
FC Zirka Kropyvnytskyi players
FC Zirka-2 Kirovohrad players
FC Yenisey Krasnoyarsk players
FC Aktobe players
FC Kaisar players
Dinaburg FC players
FC Molodechno players
FC Torpedo Mogilev players
FC Hirnyk Kryvyi Rih players
Ukrainian football managers
Ukrainian expatriate football managers
Expatriate football managers in Russia
FC Tighina players
FC Peremoha Dnipro managers